(A Little Touch of) Baroque in Winter is a 1995 Christmas EP by Takako Minekawa.

Track listing
 "Jesu, Joy of Man's Desiring" – 3:03
 "Christmas Wish" – 2:51
 "La Valse Grise n° 3 on Aminúre" – 1:45
 "Snow Frolic" – 1:57

Takako Minekawa EPs
1995 EPs
1995 Christmas albums
Christmas albums by Japanese artists
Christmas EPs